Mike Craven may refer to:

 Mike Craven (footballer) (born 1957), former English footballer 
 Mike Craven (American football), American football coach in the United States